Martin Township may refer to:

Arkansas
 Martin Township, Conway County, Arkansas, in Conway County, Arkansas
 Martin Township, Pope County, Arkansas

Illinois
 Martin Township, Crawford County, Illinois
 Martin Township, McLean County, Illinois

Kansas
 Martin Township, Smith County, Kansas, in Smith County, Kansas

Michigan
 Martin Township, Michigan

Minnesota
 Martin Township, Rock County, Minnesota

Nebraska
 Martin Township, Hall County, Nebraska, in Hall County, Nebraska

North Dakota
 Martin Township, Sheridan County, North Dakota, in Sheridan County, North Dakota
 Martin Township, Walsh County, North Dakota

South Dakota
 Martin Township, Perkins County, South Dakota, in Perkins County, South Dakota

Township name disambiguation pages